Raw is the third album by drummer Keith LeBlanc, released in January 1990 by Blanc Records. It was released under the pseudonym Raw and comprises four remixes from LeBlanc's second album Stranger Than Fiction.

Track listing

Personnel 

Musicians
Gary Clail – vocals (4)
Andy Fairley – vocals (4)
David Harrow – keyboards (1-3, 5, 7, 8)
Keith LeBlanc – drums, percussion, producer, mixing (1-5, 7, 8)
Bonjo Iyabinghi Noah – percussion (8)
Bim Sherman – vocals (5, 7)

Technical personnel
Andy Montgomery – engineering
Dave Pine – engineering, mixing (8)
Adrian Sherwood – engineering, mixing (1-7)

Release history

References

External links 
 

1990 albums
1990 remix albums
Keith LeBlanc albums
Albums produced by Keith LeBlanc